Lyman M. Brackett House is a historic home located at Rochester, Fulton County, Indiana.  It was built in 1884–1886, and is a -story, irregular plan, Queen Anne style frame dwelling topped by a slate gable roof. It features multiple gables, an octagonal tower, and wraparound brick porch.  Also on the property is a contributing carriage house.

It was listed on the National Register of Historic Places in 1984.

References

Houses on the National Register of Historic Places in Indiana
Queen Anne architecture in Indiana
Houses completed in 1886
Buildings and structures in Fulton County, Indiana
National Register of Historic Places in Fulton County, Indiana
1886 establishments in Indiana